Latex Cult is the fourth full-length album by Finnish black metal band Impaled Nazarene. A music video was made for "1999: Karmakeddon Warriors".

Track listing
All music and lyrics by Impaled Nazarene, except where noted.
"66.6 s of Foreplay" 1:06
"1999: Karmakeddon Warriors" 2:38
"Violence I Crave" 1:37
"Bashing in Heads" 1:10
"Motörpenis" 2:21
"Zum Kotzen" (Music: Impaled Nazarene; Lyrics: Potka) 3:14
"Alien Militant" 2:46
"Goat War" 0:52
"Punishment Is Absolute" 2:47
"When All Golden Turned to Shit" 1:26
"Masterbator" 2:25
"Burning of Provinciestraat" 3:12
"I Eat Pussy for Breakfast" 1:25
"Delirium Tremens" 3:21

Personnel
Mika Luttinen – vocals
Jarmo Anttila – guitar
Taneli Jarva – bass
Reima Kellokoski – drums

Production
Executive Producer – Osmose Productions
Produced by Mika Luttinen and Jarmo Anttila
Engineers – Ahti Kortelainen

1996 albums
Impaled Nazarene albums
Osmose Productions albums